This list shows the songs which have been number one on the official chart list (VG-lista) in Norway. The single list started in 1958, and the albums list in 1967. The show is broadcast every Wednesday by NRK P3, one of Norwegian Broadcasting Corporation's three nationwide analogue radio channels.

This page shows all the number-ones starting with 1995. For earlier lists, see pages for 1958, 1959, 1960, 1961, 1962, 1963 and 1964 to 1994.

1995-2008

2009

2010

2011

2012

2013

2014

2015

2016

2017

2018

2019

2020

2021

2022

2023

See also
List of number-one albums in Norway

References

External links
 VG-lista official chart website
 Topplista website
 Podcasts of the latest radioshows